Red Creek is a village in Wayne County, New York, United States. The population was 532 at the 2010 census.

The Village of Red Creek is located at the eastern edge of the Town of Wolcott and shares a border with both the Town of Sterling and Town of Victory in Cayuga County. The village is west of Syracuse and east of Rochester.

History 

The village was permanently settled circa 1811 and was originally called "Jacksonville" after Andrew Jackson.  The name was changed to "Red Creek" in approximately 1836.

The name change was attributed to the creek which passes through its entirety. Originally, Big Red and Little Red Creeks were believed to be named from the waters color, which was tainted from passing over iron ore that richly runs throughout the water bed.

Local lore explains the origin of the name Red Creek. At one time, a tannery occupied the spot on the north side of the falls. As part of the tanning process, dye was used to tan skins. Dye was disposed of in the pond which then flowed over the dam's falls, coloring it red.

The village was incorporated in 1852. In 1874, most of the business district was consumed by fire.

Geography
Red Creek is located at  (43.247848, -76.722786).

The village is at the border of Cayuga County.

Red Creek is also the name of the creek that flows through the community, and dammed to form a small pond on the south edge of the village.

New York State Route 104A passes through the village in a north–south direction as "Wolcott Street," "Water Street," and "Main Street."

Demographics

As of the census of 2010, there were 532 people, 201 households, and 139 families residing in the village. The population density was 591.1 people per square mile (221.7/km2). The racial makeup of the village was 97.0% White, 1.3% Black or African American, 0.9% Native American, 0.4% Asian, 0.0% Pacific Islander, 0.0% from other races, and 0.4% from two or more races. Hispanic or Latino of any race were 3.0% of the population.

There were 201 households, out of which 38.8% had children under the age of 18 living with them, 47.8% were married couples living together, 13.4% had a female householder with no husband present, and 30.8% were non-families. 24.9% of all households were made up of individuals, and 7.5% had someone living alone who was 65 years of age or older. The average household size was 2.65 and the average family size was 3.12.

In the village, the population was spread out, with 34.0% under the age of 20, 5.8% from 20 to 24, 25.4% from 25 to 44, 24.6% from 45 to 64, and 10.4% who were 65 years of age or older. The median age was 33.9 years. For every 100 females, there were 102.3 males. For every 100 females age 18 and over, there were 96.2 males.

The median income for a household in the village was $46,250, and the median income for a family was $44,911. Males had a median income of $44,167 versus $37,500 for females. The per capita income for the village was $19,503. About 8.7% of families and 12.6% of the population were below the poverty line, including 18.0% of those under age 18 and 8.2% of those age 65 or over.

Housing
There were 237 housing units at an average density of 263.3 per square mile (98.8/km2); a total of 15.2% of housing units were vacant.

There were 201 occupied housing units in the village, of which 148 were owner-occupied units (73.6%), while 53 were renter-occupied (26.4%). The homeowner vacancy rate was 2.0% of total units. The rental unit vacancy rate was 16.4%.

Government
Mayor: Charles A. Palermo
Deputy Mayor/Trustee: Erika Barnes
Trustee: Michael Bettis
Trustee: Kevin Doll
Trustee: Greg Schiller
Village Clerk/Treasurer: Susan Saylor
NYS Code Enforcement Officer: Bob Day
Public Health Officer: June Smith

Notable people
George Mangus, baseball player
Mike Novak, basketball player

References

External links

Red Creek Fire Department
 History of Red Creek, NY
 RW&O Railroad, Red Creek, NY

1852 establishments in New York (state)
Populated places established in 1852
Villages in Wayne County, New York
Rochester metropolitan area, New York
Villages in New York (state)